Few Good Things is the third studio album by American rapper Saba. It was released on February 4, 2022 via Saba Pivot, LLC. The album includes guest appearances from Black Thought, G Herbo, Krayzie Bone, 6lack, Smino, Mereba, Fousheé and Eryn Allen Kane, as well as Pivot Gang.

Background
On February 9, Saba released the eponymous short film directed by C.T. Robert. Saba explained the film in a press release saying:

Singles and promotion
During 2020 and 2021, Saba released many promotional singles including: "Ziplock", "Rich Don't Stop", "Mrs. Whoever", "Something in the Water", "So and So", and "Are You Down". On November 4, 2021, Saba announced his third album Few Good Things and released the first single titled "Fearmonger". On November 18, he released the second single titled "Stop That". On January 13, 2022, he released the third single "Come My Way" featuring Krayzie Bone. The fourth single "Survivor's Guilt" featuring G Herbo was released on January 27.

Critical reception

Few Good Things was met with widespread critical acclaim from music critics.  At Metacritic, which assigns a normalized rating out of 100 to reviews from mainstream publications, the album received an average score of 83, based on 6 reviews. Kyann-Sian Williams of NME gave the album 5 out of 5 stars saying "On this record, Saba expertly blends the whimsical and spiritual nature of soul music with GOAT-level penmanship reminiscent of the conscious rap of yesteryear. The result is a glorious neo-rap sound. It doesn't quite fit in with his contemporaries' party music, and he's not always as crafty and traditional as hip-hop, so rappers like Saba often stay on the wayside, delivering absolute perfection without many accolades. That would be a shame, as this is an album at a divine level." 

Consequence wrote that "Few Good Things builds on Saba's quest to just live life while acknowledging that's a loaded proposition at times. It's hard telling someone else to pull themselves up by their bootstraps when they don't even have a boot, when there are fewer straps upon which to tug. Saba lives with that feeling every day, doing his best to enjoy the fruits of his labor, help as many as he can, and not get depressed knowing he can't save everyone." Jayson Greene of Pitchfork wrote about the production from Saba, daedaePIVOT, and Daoud saying "As the trio has forged their sound, Saba’s flow has softened and turned more melodic. He works best when his voice is another instrument in the mix, freely mixing up registers between melody and rhythm."

Track listing

Charts

References

2022 albums
Saba (rapper) albums
Midwest hip hop albums
Hip hop albums by American artists